Acciptrid herpesvirus 1 (AcHV-1) is an unaccepted species of virus suggested to belong to the order Herpesvirales and family Herpesviridae. It was isolated from a bald eagle (Haliaeetus leucocephalus).

References 

Herpesvirales
Unaccepted virus taxa